Prince Obeng Ampem (born 13 April 1998) is a Ghanaian professional footballer who plays as a winger for Croatian First Football League club HNK Rijeka.

Career

As a youth player, Ampem was spotted by scouts from Feyenoord, one of the Netherlands' most successful clubs, who signed him for their affiliate, the West African Football Academy, where he also gained the attention of Austrian side Red Bull Salzburg.

In 2018, Ampem signed for Šibenik in the Croatian top flight.

References

External links
 Prince Ampem at Soccerway

Ghanaian footballers
Living people
Association football forwards
Association football wingers
1998 births
West African Football Academy players
HNK Šibenik players
HNK Rijeka players
People from Sunyani District
Croatian Football League players